This article lists the winners and nominees for the Black Reel Award for Outstanding Breakthrough Performance. Academy Award-nominated or winning performances also honored with nominations or wins at the Black Reel Awards include Jennifer Hudson (Dreamgirls), Octavia Spencer (The Help), Quvenzhané Wallis (Beasts of the Southern Wild) and Gabourey Sidibe (Precious).

During the 2014 ceremony, the category was divided into gender specific categories (Outstanding Breakthrough Performance, Male and Outstanding Breakthrough Performance, Female).

Winners and nominees
Winners are listed first and highlighted in bold.

2000s

2010s

References

Black Reel Awards